In Pre-Columbian times, the Inca Empire relied on messengers named chasquis for official communications; the chasquis used a special stone-paved road named Capac Ñan, and quipus, cotton or camelid fiber strings, collecting data with a special pattern of knots and colors. After Spanish conquest of Peru, the old Inca system was preserved in their basics, still using chasquis and Capac Ñan, but without quipus deemed as “tool for idolatries” by Spanish colonial authorities, founding the rich Viceroyalty of Perú. In 1821 Peru declared independence from Spain and decisively defeated colonial forces at the Battle of Ayacucho in 1824.

The newly created Republic of Peru began using lithographed stamps in 1857 that initially were provided by the Pacific Steam Navigation Company, a Bristish shipping service serving mail and trade at Western South America. a British shipping service serving mail and trade in western South America. The Peruvian government authorized, as essay, using only two PSNC stamps (1 real blue and 2 reales red) for mail in the Peruvian postal service, from December 1st, 1857. 

After a successful experience, Peru issued their own lithographed stamps in March 1858, in a three-values issue; this created the first stamp error in Peruvian philately: the half peso rose.  Still, a lot of copies of Peru's PSNC stamps circulation were forged, with colors never circulated as state-sponsored mail, or fantasy cancellations.

Around 1860 Peruvian government purchased a French-made device (the so-called "Lecoq" press) that was used to print, emboss and cut imperforate stamps from paper strips. This press was used in four stamps issued with national arms (1 dinero red, 1 peseta light brown, 1 dinero green, and 1 peseta orange). The commemorative stamp illustrated to the right (the "Trencito" or "little train" of 1870) was one of the last Peru produced on this rare machine, with the 2 centavos light blue (the "Llamita" stamp). After this issues, Peruvian postal service only used perforated stamps from 1874 onwards.

For a catalogue used by collectors to classify early Peruvian (imperforate) stamps by their cancellations, see Lamy (and Rinck).

References

Further reading
 Nicoletti, Gonzales Carlos. El Servicio Postal y filatélico en el Perú. 1991. Awarded the Alvaro Bonilla Lara Medal in 1991 by the FIAF.
 Salvatteci, Aldo. Tratados Postales del Perú hasta su ingreso a la Unión Postal Universal. 2003.

External links

Peru Philatelic Study Circle
The Trencito and the Medals of Charles E. Bryant: A coincidence? by Antonio Llaveria.

Philately of Peru